The 1902 Villanova Wildcats football team represented the Villanova University during the 1902 college football season. The team's captain was Timothy O'Rourke.

Schedule

References

Villanova
Villanova Wildcats football seasons
Villanova Wildcats football